The Torneo República (Republic Tournament) is a defunct official football tournament from Paraguay. The competition was held at the beginning of the year and its purpose was to integrate teams from the Asunción area with teams from other departments in order to give teams from all over the country a chance to qualify for international CONMEBOL tournaments.

Finals

Performance by club

References

Bibliography
 Corporación Deportiva Fénix (ed.) Campeones Oficiales. (In Spanish) Retrieved Nov 8, 2012.
 Torres, Carlos (Oct 30, 2012) D10 (ed.) «Los equipos "campesinos" en la Primera División». (In Spanish) Retrieved Dec 20, 2012.

Defunct football competitions in Paraguay
1990 in Paraguayan football
1991 in Paraguayan football
1992 in Paraguayan football
1993 in Paraguayan football
1995 in Paraguayan football